Melba High School is a public high school in Melba, Idaho.

Sports 
Football
Baseball 
Basketball
Softball
Volleyball
Cross Country
Track
In 2002, Melba beat Glenns Ferry High School in the 2A Football State Championship

Clubs and Student Organizations 

A tragedy struck Melba High School in 1987 for the FFA members. En route home from the FFA convention they laid over in Denver. On the way home from Denver the plane crashed taking off. The FFA advisor's wife and three students were killed in the crash.

BPA
FCCLA
FFA
FHLA
Chess Club
DotA Club
Mustang Readers' Choice Award Committee
Choir
HOSA
Pep band
Marching Band

References

Public high schools in Idaho
Schools in Canyon County, Idaho